Gulebki (Dargwa: ГъулебкIи) is a rural locality (a selo) in Tsugninsky Selsoviet, Akushinsky District, Republic of Dagestan, Russia. The population was 386 as of 2010. There are 6 streets.

Geography 
Gulebki is located 30 km southeast of Akusha (the district's administrative centre) by road, on the Tsugnikotta River. Tsugni is the nearest rural locality.

References 

Rural localities in Akushinsky District